Tom Bouman is an American author, editor and musician.

Personal life 
He studied law from Pennsylvania. In 2016, he joined Aspen Words as writer in residence. He lives with her wife and two daughters in Upstate New York.

Selected publications 

 Dry Bones in the Valley
 Fateful Mornings: A Henry Farrell Novel
 The Bramble and the Rose

Awards 

 Los Angeles Times Book Prize for Mystery/Thriller in 2014 for Dry Bones in the Valley
 Edgar Award for Best First Novel in 2015 for Dry Bones in the Valley
 Shortlisted for Macavity Award for Best First Mystery Novel in 2015 for Dry Bones in the Valley

Critical reception 
Michael Sims of The Washington Post judged it "exciting debut thriller" and Marilyn Stasio of The New York Times called it "beautiful novel".

References 

21st-century American novelists
Living people
Year of birth missing (living people)
Edgar Award winners